The 1968 Segunda División Peruana, the second division of Peruvian football (soccer), was played by 10 teams. The tournament winner, Deportivo Municipal was promoted to the 1969 Torneo Descentralizado.

Results

Standings

External links
 Municipal volvió a Primera 1968

Peruvian Segunda División seasons
Peruana, 1968
1968 in Peruvian football